The 2014–15 Tennessee Tech Golden Eagles men's basketball team represented Tennessee Technological University during the 2014–15 NCAA Division I men's basketball season. The Golden Eagles, led by fourth year head coach Steve Payne, played their home games at the Eblen Center and were members of the East Division of the Ohio Valley Conference. They finished the season 12–18, 4–12 in OVC play to finish in fifth place in the East Division. They failed to qualify for the OVC Tournament.

Roster

Schedule

|-
!colspan=9 style="background:#7329B0; color:#F7D417;"| Exhibition

|-
!colspan=9 style="background:#7329B0; color:#F7D417;"| Regular season

References

Tennessee Tech Golden Eagles men's basketball seasons
Tennessee Tech
Tennessee Tech Golden Eagles men's basketball
Tennessee Tech Golden Eagles men's basketball